The 2017 Chatham Cup (known as the ISPS Handa Chatham Cup for sponsorship reasons) was New Zealand's 90th annual knockout football competition.

The 2017 competition had a preliminary round and four rounds proper before quarter-finals, semi-finals, and a final. The final was played on 10 September 2017.

Results

Preliminary round
All matches were played between 22–25 April 2017.

Northern Region

Central / Capital Region

Mainland Region

Southern Region

Round 1
Round 1 matches took place between 13–14 May 2017.

Northern Region

Central / Capital Region

Mainland Region

Southern Region

Round 2
All matches were played on 5 June 2017.

Northern Region

Capital / Central Region

 Mainland Region

Southern Region

Round 3
The draw for Round 3 fixtures took place on 7 June, with matches played between 24–25 June.

Northern Region

Central / Capital Region

Mainland / Southern Region

Round 4
Round 4 was played between 15–16 July. The draw took place on 27 June.

Northern Region

Capital / Central Region

Mainland / Southern Region

Quarter-finals
The quarter-finals were played between 5–6 August.

Semi-finals
The semi-finals were played between 26–27 August.

Final
The final took place on 10 September 2017.

References

External links
Chatham Cup section on the New Zealand Football website

Chatham Cup
Chatham Cup
Chatham Cup
Chatham Cup
September 2017 sports events in New Zealand